Little Brook may refer to:

Little Brook, New Jersey, an unincorporated community located within Lebanon Township in Hunterdon County, New Jersey, United States
Little Brook, Nova Scotia, a community located in the Clare Municipal District in Digby County, Nova Scotia, Canada

See also
Little Flat Brook, a 12.7-mile-long (20.4 km) tributary of Flat Brook in Sussex County, New Jersey in the United States
Littlebrook Power Station, series of four oil and coal-fired power stations situated on the south bank of the River Thames, next to the Queen Elizabeth 2 Bridge and the Dartford Tunnel in Dartford, Kent
Lord Littlebrook (1929–2016), professional name of the British midget wrestler Eric Tovey